Plesiogulo is a genus of prehistoric carnivore that lived from Miocene to Pliocene of Africa, Eurasia and North America. An ancestral relationship to the wolverine (Gulo gulo) was once suggested, but it is no longer considered likely. However, some authorities still consider it a member of the Guloninae.

Species
The following species have been currently described for this genus:

 †P. brachygnathus (Schlosser, 1903)
 †P. botori Haile-Selassie, Hlusko & Howell, 2004
 †P. crassa Teilhard de Chardin, 1945
 †P. marshalli (Martin, 1928)
 †P. lindsayi Harrison, 1981
 †P. monspessulanus Viret, 1939
 †P. praecocidens Kurtén, 1970

References

External links
What Exactly Is A Marten?
The Palaeobiology Database

Guloninae
Pliocene carnivorans
Prehistoric mustelids
Prehistoric carnivoran genera